George H. Taylor (born September 1869)  was an American baseball first baseman and manager in the pre-Negro leagues.

While with the Page Fence Giants, Taylor played with many of the popular players of the day, including Charlie Grant, John W. Patterson, Chappie Johnson, George Wilson, William Binga, Home Run Johnson, Sherman Barton, and Peter Burns.

In 1892 Taylor played in the Nebraska State League for Beatrice.

He continued to play for Chicago teams Chicago Union Giants and Leland Giants, working with many of those same players.

In 1907, he took some of those players to the St. Paul Colored Gophers, where he captained the team that year.

References

External links
Baseball statistics and player information from Baseball-Reference Black Baseball Stats and Seamheads

Leland Giants players
Page Fence Giants players
St. Paul Colored Gophers players
1869 births
Year of death missing